The 2019 UCI America Tour was the fifteenth season of the UCI America Tour. The season began on October 23, 2018 with the Vuelta a Guatemala and ended on 12 October 2019.

The points leader, based on the cumulative results of previous races, wears the UCI America Tour cycling jersey. Throughout the season, points are awarded to the top finishers of stages within stage races and the final general classification standings of each of the stages races and one-day events. The quality and complexity of a race also determines how many points are awarded to the top finishers, the higher the UCI rating of a race, the more points are awarded.

The UCI ratings from highest to lowest are as follows:
 Multi-day events: 2.HC, 2.1 and 2.2
 One-day events: 1.HC, 1.1 and 1.2

Events

2018

2019

Final standings

Individual classification

Team classification

Nation classification

References

External links
 

 
2019
2019 in men's road cycling
2019 in North American sport
2019 in South American sport